Jean Bellande Joseph Foundation is an initiative started by Claude Saint Hilaire and Paul Brunet Joseph in Cayes-Jacmel a small town on the southern coast of Haiti.  The two men wished to honor their benefactor, Jean Bellande Joseph, who died on September 15, 2007.

Joseph
Jean Bellande Joseph was born on October 23, 1944.  He married and had seven children while working professionally as a tailor.  He lived his life with the profound sense that he should share his successes with the disadvantaged.  To that end, he supported several generations of rural children in their educations.

Rural issues
Families and households in the rural region of Cayes-Jacmel, Haiti face countless difficulties. The parents of disadvantaged children often practice subsistence agriculture on leased land. The deforestation of rural Haiti makes it increasingly difficult to make ends meet by farming, and parents are frequently unable to provide basic needs for their children, like adequate food, medicine and education. Of primary concern to us are the great numbers of rural children who are not able to go to school.  These children are at risk of delinquency, but they are often undernourished and go without basic supports.  Although several initiatives have been undertaken, the predicament of destitute rural children is too often ignored.  This situation compelled us to found and operate an institution able to help the children that live in these onerous conditions.

Mission
Their mission is a social one, and their motto “S’unir pour sauver les enfants défavorisés” translates, “United to save disadvantaged children.” Jean Bellande Joseph Foundation  is blind to the religion or sex of children. They are a social organization offering a non-profit service to society.

Objectives
Their objectives are to: improve the quality of life of disadvantaged children and provide them with adequate supports such as food and medicines, support and strengthen the education of the child, so that she becomes a good citizen, capable of helping her country, empower rural children by helping them integrate socially in the broader society, combat juvenile delinquency, defend the rights of children, support and encourage the development of children at the social, economic, cultural, and artistic levels, achieve the elimination of all forms of discrimination against rural children.

The Foundation has many donors who sponsor a few children who cannot go to school or have a square meal every day. They seek to provide a hot meal seven days a week for the children that frequent the foundation. They seek to provide a vitamin program for the children to ensure that they are receiving the proper nutrients. They seek to immunize these children and ensure that there is a medical safety net for them in the instance of their sickness. They seek to support the educations of these children, paying their school fees and providing them with scholarly materials such as books, backpacks and other school supplies, and the appropriate clothes and shoes for school.  They seek to support the social integration of rural children by providing a place for them to come and socialize, learn and engage with their peers, while contributing to their local community through service projects.

History
They began their organization with the aforementioned goals and initiatives.  Because of the economic difficulties of the recent past and the devastating earthquake of January 12, 2010, that destroyed everything that they had, it was necessary for them to start anew.  They have been struggling, ever since the earthquake to raise balance sheets to the level needed to sustain their work.  This situation leaves them tremendously vulnerable.

Their primary initiatives highlight the support and provision of education, nutrition and health for 35+ children in the rural areas of Cayes-Jacmel. The calculations for their budget are based on anticipated expenses for each child during the year.  Their annual budget is $22,100 USD.  The food budget is for one meal per day for each child.  This includes the food itself and the cost for preparing it.  School starts  in October and it is important to us that children are properly enrolled in schools at this time. The allowance for school includes scholarly materials and the appropriate clothes.  The medical allowance provides for immunizations and emergency medications and doctor visits as well as a vitamin program.

It is necessary that they provide support to the staff that work with the children each day. They have budgeted an allowance for the teacher and assistants at the foundation and for the facilities themselves.

References

www.haiti-edu.org

Child-related organizations in Haiti
Foundations based in Haiti